Owaab Barrow (born 20 August 2001) is a Qatari athlete. He competed in the men's 100 metres event at the 2019 World Athletics Championships. He won the Youth Olympic title of 110 m hurdles (91.4cm) at the 2018 Youth Olympics.

References

External links

 

2001 births
Living people
Qatari male sprinters
Qatari male hurdlers
Place of birth missing (living people)
World Athletics Championships athletes for Qatar
Athletes (track and field) at the 2018 Summer Youth Olympics
Athletes (track and field) at the 2018 Asian Games
Youth Olympic gold medalists for Qatar
Youth Olympic gold medalists in athletics (track and field)
Asian Games competitors for Qatar